Namibicola simplex is a species of snout moth in the genus Namibicola. It was described by Boris Balinsky in 1994 and is known from South Africa (including Eastern Cape, the type localation).

References

Endemic moths of South Africa
Moths described in 1994
Phycitinae